Calico Railroad may refer to:

Iowa Central Air Line Railroad, a historic railroad in Iowa, United States
Waterloo Mining Railroad, a railroad that hauled silver from the mines around Calico, California, United States, from 1888 to 1903
Ghost Town & Calico Railroad, a heritage railroad attraction at the Knott's Berry Farm theme park in California, United States, inspired by the Waterloo railroad